Mosquito, Grizzly Bear's Head, Lean Man TLE 1 is an Indian reserve of the Mosquito, Grizzly Bear's Head, Lean Man First Nations in Saskatchewan.

References

Indian reserves in Saskatchewan